Orthosias may refer to:
 Orthosias in Caria
 Orthosias in Phoenicia